The Philippines v Tajikistan was a 2019 AFC Asian Cup qualification match between the Philippines and Tajikistan. It was hosted at the Rizal Memorial Stadium.

The match was significant because of the encounter's outcome. The joy was not only for the Philippines, but it was also shared to Yemen, another team in their qualification group. The match's outcome gave both the Philippines and Yemen their first ever AFC Asian Cup in the two nations' history and was celebrated in both nations. In Yemen, the match was known as the "Miracle of Manila".

Background
</onlyinclude>

At the time of the 2019 Asian Cup qualification phase, the Philippines and Tajikistan shared their group with Yemen and minnows Nepal. All four had previously never made a debut in the tournament. Until the final match, Nepal was officially eliminated, but the rest still held some chances. The Philippines had the brightest prospect among all, having achieved two wins but still only two points ahead of both Yemen and Tajikistan. A defeat for the Philippines meant that the country had to wait for the encounter between Yemen and Nepal, which limited the chance of them to qualify. The Filipinos had already missed an opportunity back in 2014, when they lost to Palestine in the 2014 AFC Challenge Cup Final.

For Tajikistan, they were also in no better position. Although tied on points with Yemen, a worse head-to-head record than the Yemenis (1–2 on aggregate) meant that only a win could give Tajikistan their ticket to the UAE. Tajikistan had repeatedly missed opportunities to qualify for the AFC Asian Cup in their history, from 1996 when they let Uzbekistan make a comeback, eventually losing 4–5 on aggregate; 2000 when they placed second after Iraq; 2004 when they lost to Thailand by just a point and most recently the 2008 AFC Challenge Cup where they lost 1–4 to India, losing their chances of qualifying for the 2011 AFC Asian Cup.

Tajikistan were edged 3–4 by the Filipinos at home in the two teams' earlier meeting. Historical encounters also pointed against Tajikistan, with the Philippines remaining undefeated against the Tajiks after two previous draws. Under such circumstances, a draw for Tajikistan would mean the only way to qualify was for Nepal to make a surprise and defeat Yemen, while for the Philippines, a draw was enough for them to qualify.

Match

Summary
The match began with the Tajiks hurrying to take the first move on the stadium as the confident hosts sought to surprise them at the early minutes. Amirbek Juraboev made a surprise pass to Jahongir Aliev but the latter missed. Soon after, Mike Ott responded with a similar header in 10', but also missed. Just two minutes later, Jahongir Ergashev made a response with a header, but it went wide. The next minutes saw the hosts beginning to overpower the Tajiks, but every attempt ended in failure. The Tajiks made some headline in 34' with a free kick, but Fatkhullo Fatkhuloev sent it beyond his teammates. Simone Rota in 37' had a chance to give the Philippines the lead from a corner kick but he aimed his shot high. In injury time of the first half, Davron Ergashev tried his luck from a direct free kick but was blocked by the wall. His handball appeal was later dismissed by Australian referee Jarred Gillett, making the first half goalless.

The second half saw the Philippines having the first chance by Phil Younghusband, but no other player could get into the ball as it went straight to Abduaziz Mahkamov's hands. Then, the Tajiks had a chance to score, but the Philippines' defence reacted quickly. In 61', the visitors suddenly made a breakthrough thanks to a skillful display from Aliev, whom his passing to captain Nuriddin Davronov forced Daisuke Sato to foul him in the penalty area. Akhtam Nazarov successfully converted the penalty to give the Tajiks an important lead in 64'. The Philippines, after being led, increased pressure and it took only 10 minutes for the hosts to equalise. A brilliant pass by Iain Ramsay, after receiving the ball from Phil Younghusband, provided a header for Kevin Ingreso to score. With the Tajiks struggling to find the way to Neil Etheridge's net, a powerful free kick by Ingreso allowed substitute Patrick Reichelt to infiltrate the Tajik defense, giving the hosts an important penalty when Iskandar Dzhalilov kicked Patrick Reichelt's chest. Phil Younghusband converted the penalty to give the Philippines a historic 2–1 lead in front of emphatic home fans. Before the end of the game, Carli de Murga and Jahongir Ergashev collided with each other and was followed by Fatkhuloev punching de Murga's face, causing a brawl in the field. Referee Gillett did not hesitate to give Dennis Villanueva a straight red card before giving Fatkhuloev another yellow card, ultimately reducing both teams to 10 men, but it meant little as the Philippines won the match.

Details

Post-match
</onlyinclude>

The win for the Philippines was the first time in history that they had qualified for a major men's football competition. The win also provided a significant boost for football in the islands, which had seen a rapid renaissance since 2010.

The Philippines' victory over Tajikistan also meant that Yemen officially qualified for the Asian Cup for the first time ever thanks to a better head-to-head record than Tajikistan. It was considered a great joy for a country torn apart by civil war. They later defeated Nepal 2–1 in their final match held in Doha, Qatar to complete their cinderella journey.

For Tajikistan, the catastrophic loss meant that they failed to qualify for the Asian Cup once again. This loss was the fifth time that Tajikistan missed an opportunity to qualify. This prompted coach Khakim Fuzailov to resign following this humiliation. As for the result, the repeated failure of a number of local coaches was instrumental in the hiring of Uzbek Usmon Toshev with hopes to reinvigorate the team.

The Philippines and Yemen were placed in Group C and Group D of the Asian Cup respectively. Both teams eventually failed in their respective groups, losing every match they played, but the Philippines managed to score a goal thanks to Stephan Schröck.

References

AFC Asian Cup matches
Philippines national football team matches
2019 AFC Asian Cup qualification
Tajikistan national football team matches
March 2018 sports events in Asia
21st century in Manila